Max Edward "Ed" Berrier III (born November 8, 1961 in Winston-Salem, North Carolina), is a second-generation NASCAR driver. His father Max Berrier competed in seven Grand National races over four years and won 125 feature races as a modified driver. His distant cousin Todd served as the crew chief for Jeff Burton in the Sprint Cup Series.

Career
Berrier started running go-karts and became a force to be reckoned with, winning 72 out of 127 races. In 1980, he moved to the NASCAR Dash Series, driving for his own team. Four years later, he made his Busch Series debut, running 18 races and finishing in top-ten three times. He would not finish that high again until 1987, when he had four top-fives. Berrier ran abbreviated schedules over the next few years (except 1988) and put together 22 top-tens. He made his Winston Cup debut in 1995 at the Mountain Dew Southern 500, finishing in 20th position. Berrier's only NASCAR start in 1996 came at Darlington Raceway, where he finished 39th. After running a limited Cup schedule with Sadler Brothers Racing in 1997, Berrier was tapped by PRW Racing to drive the No. 77 UAW/Lear-sponsored Ford in the Busch Series. After putting together three Top 20 finishes in an abbreviated run, Berrier returned to the team in 1998, this time, with former Cup campaigner Jimmy Means as crew chief. The highlight of this year came at the final Galaxy Food Centers 300. Berrier dominated, starting on the outside pole, leading 187 laps, and garnering his only victory at a premier NASCAR series. Despite DNQ-ing at Rockingham Speedway, Berrier and company finished seventeenth in points that year. Unfortunately, Berrier's success did not carry over into 1999, and after qualifying for just 17 races, Berrier was fired.

Berrier soon landed on his feet, by running a limited schedule for Junie Donlavey in late 1999. After his audition, Donlavey signed Berrier to drive for his team with a package sponsorship from Hills Brothers Coffee. Unfortunately, the sight of the team packing up and heading home after second round qualifying became too common, and Berrier was released once again. Berrier's Cup series career resulted in 19 races and 25 DNQs, with a best Cup finish of 20th in a 1995 Darlington race. He ran the inaugural Busch Series race at Kansas Speedway but crashed on the 10th lap. Berrier's last NASCAR race came in the Craftsman Truck Series season opener in 2003, finishing 13th for Kevin Harvick Incorporated.

Following his racing career, Berrier worked as a crew chief in NASCAR competition. As of 2017, Ed Berrier is employed at JKS Motorsports Incorporated in Welcome, North Carolina, as the lead fabricator and sometimes stunt driver for motorsports-related commercial shoots and movies.

Motorsports career results

NASCAR
(key) (Bold – Pole position awarded by qualifying time. Italics – Pole position earned by points standings or practice time. * – Most laps led.)

Winston Cup Series

Daytona 500

Busch Series

Craftsman Truck Series

ARCA Re/Max Series
(key) (Bold – Pole position awarded by qualifying time. Italics – Pole position earned by points standings or practice time. * – Most laps led.)

References

External links
 
 
 

Living people
1961 births
Sportspeople from Winston-Salem, North Carolina
Racing drivers from North Carolina
NASCAR drivers
ARCA Menards Series drivers
ISCARS Dash Touring Series drivers
NASCAR team owners
NASCAR crew chiefs